HŠK Hajduk was a football club from Zemun (nowadays Serbia). Local Croats from Zemun and other parts of Syrmia gathered around this club.

Name
Its name literally means  Croatian Sports Club "Hajduk".

History
The squad competed in the football championship of Independent State of Croatia. After the end of Second World War, that circumstance was used to ban the work of this football club and disband it, as it was the case with other clubs that competed in the championship of Independent State of Croatia.

In the unfinished Croatian championship 1944, in the group stage (City of Zemun championship), Hajduk took the last place in the group, behind Dunav, Građanski and Liet, and ended the competition.

Sources 
 Croatia Domestic Football Full Tables

Defunct football clubs in Croatia
Defunct football clubs in Serbia
Association football clubs disestablished in 1945
1945 disestablishments in Croatia